Hello, My Name Is Doris is a 2015 American coming-of-age romantic comedy-drama film directed by Michael Showalter from a screenplay by Laura Terruso and Showalter, about a woman in her 60s who tries to act on her attraction to a younger co-worker. It stars Sally Field in the title role, alongside Max Greenfield, Beth Behrs, Wendi McLendon-Covey, Stephen Root, Elizabeth Reaser, Natasha Lyonne and Tyne Daly.

The film had its world premiere at the SXSW Film Festival on March 14, 2015, and was theatrically released on March 11, 2016, by Roadside Attractions.

Plot

Doris Miller is a shy, eccentric, 60-something woman, living alone following the death of her mother, with whom she has lived for her whole life. At the funeral, her brother Todd and his wife Cynthia try to persuade her to sell the house, especially the possessions she has hoarded over decades. 

Doris had been caring for her mother for years and thereby neglecting her own social life and development. As a result, she is relatively reclusive and unfamiliar with social trends. She spends time with her close friend, the fiery Roz, and her teenage granddaughter, Vivian. 

On Doris's way to work in Manhattan, where she has been doing data entry for decades, she meets her new young co-worker, John, with whom she is immediately infatuated. Empowered by self-improvement tapes, Doris decides to pursue a romantic relationship with him.

Doris finds ways to get John's attention; the attempts are frequently combined with fantasies about a passionate love affair between them. With Vivian's help, Doris creates a fake social media profile in order to find information about John and discovers that he loves an electro-pop band that is planning an upcoming concert in the area. Doris buys one of the band's CDs, which gets John's attention, and attends the concert, where she meets him and they spend time together. 

The band is intrigued by Doris and invite her backstage, where they spend a fun evening meeting young artists in the area. John tells Doris that he and his girlfriend recently broke up over text and asks her about her love life. She reveals that she was engaged in the past, but had to end it to take care of her mother. John gives her a friendly kiss goodnight, cementing Doris' unrequited love.

John is distracted for the next week, and Doris discovers that he has a girlfriend, Brooklyn. Though she is friendly and welcoming, Doris is devastated. She spends the night drinking wine and impulsively posts a comment on John's social media wall while using her fake profile, posing as a scorned young woman with whom he had a torrid love affair. 

The next morning, Todd arrives with Doris' therapist, planning on decluttering her house, but when Cynthia tries to throw out a pencil Doris stole from John, Doris angrily throws them out.

At work, Brooklyn arrives and has a fight with John before breaking up with him. She later tells Doris that she had seen the comment on his wall and accused him of cheating, as she was cheated on in the past. After work, John tells Doris about the incident and invites her to his Thanksgiving for friends. She agrees, and when he asks her if she would ever be interested in dating a younger man, she is elated.

Doris dresses up the Thanksgiving party where she meets John's uncle, who is clearly interested. During the party, she asks to talk to John in his bedroom. Trying to come onto him, Doris admits she has always liked him and that the comment causing Brooklyn to break up with him was hers. 

Furious, John rebuffs her. When a flustered Doris asks him what he meant by asking her if she was interested in younger men, John clarifies that he was trying to set her up with his uncle, who is a decade younger than her. Doris leaves, deeply hurt, and invites Roz over for comfort.

Doris invites her therapist over again to declutter her house, and she succeeds in getting it cleaned up. She quits her job and says good-bye to John before she leaves. She has another fantasy where John kisses her and proposes they be together; in reality, she enters the elevator to leave, alone. After hesitating, John calls out her name and runs toward the elevator. Doris smiles as the doors close.

Cast

Sally Field as Doris Miller
Max Greenfield as John Fremont
Beth Behrs as Brooklyn Henderson 
Tyne Daly as Roz
Stephen Root as Todd Miller
Wendi McLendon-Covey as Cynthia Miller
Elizabeth Reaser as Dr. Edwards
Isabella Acres as Vivian
Peter Gallagher as Willy Williams
Natasha Lyonne as Sally
Kumail Nanjiani as Nasir
Rich Sommer as Robert
Caroline Aaron as Val
Rebecca Wisocky as Anne Patterson
Jack Antonoff as Baby Goya
Kyle Mooney as Niles
Nnamdi Asomugha as Shaka
Roz Ryan as The Nurse
Anna Akana as Blog Girl
Amy Okuda as Des
Don Stark as Uncle Frank

Production
On April 18, 2014, Max Greenfield was cast in the male lead role. On May 28, 2014, it was announced that Sally Field would play the title character, and on the same day Beth Behrs was also cast. On June 27, 2014, Natasha Lyonne, Wendi McLendon-Covey, Kyle Mooney, and Kumail Nanjiani were announced as part of the cast. On July 11, 2014, YouTube star Anna Akana was cast as a web blogger whose attention is piqued by Field's character.

Release
The film had its world premiere on March 14, 2015, at South by Southwest. Shortly after it was announced Roadside Attractions had acquired distribution rights to the film. It was later revealed that Stage 6 Films would co-partner on the domestic release, and release the film internationally. The film also screened at the Montclair Film Festival on May 1, 2015. The film was theatrically released on March 11, 2016, in a limited release, before opening in a wide release on April 1, 2016.

Reception
Hello, My Name Is Doris received generally positive reviews from film critics. It holds a "Certified Fresh" 85% rating on the review aggregator website Rotten Tomatoes, based on 128 reviews, with an average rating of 6.90/10. The critical consensus reads, "Hello, My Name Is Doris is immeasurably elevated by Sally Field's remarkable performance in the title role, which overpowers a surfeit of stereotypical indie quirk." On Metacritic, the film holds a rating of 63 out of 100, based on 25 critics, indicating "generally favorable reviews".

Joe Leydon of Variety gave the film a positive review, writing "Sally Field keeps the movie on an even keel, for the most part, with an adroit and disciplined lead performance that generates both laughter and sympathy, with relatively few yanks on the heartstrings. Audiences of a certain age might respond warmly, provided they are stoked by savvy marketing and favorable word of mouth." Eric Kohn of Indiewire.com also gave the film a positive review, a B+, writing "Hello, My Name is Doris effectively conveys the cruel ambivalence of an ageist society, and despite its formulaic ingredients, the movie responds to that setback with Field's exuberant, virtuoso turn providing the ultimate critical response."

Accolades

References

External links 
 
 

2015 films
2015 independent films
2015 romantic comedy-drama films
American independent films
American romantic comedy-drama films
Features based on short films
Films directed by Michael Showalter
Films set in New York City
Films set in Staten Island
Films shot in New York City
2010s English-language films
2010s American films